Larry A. Elliott (November 9, 1935 – April 13, 2008) was an American football and baseball coach.  He was the 32nd and 36th head football coach for Washburn University in Topeka, Kansas.  He held that position for five seasons, from 1974 until 1978 and then returned for six more seasons, from 1984 until 1989.  His overall coaching record at Washburn was 58 wins, 51 losses, and 1 ties.

Elliott led the Ichabods to a victory in the 1974 Boot Hill Bowl over Millikin University, the school's first post-season football appearance.  In 1986, he was placed in the Washburn University Athletic Hall of Fame.

Head coaching record

Football

Notes

References

1935 births
2008 deaths
American football quarterbacks
Kansas State Wildcats football players
Washburn Ichabods baseball coaches
Washburn Ichabods football coaches
Washburn Ichabods football players
People from La Junta, Colorado
Players of American football from Colorado